Hans Olof von Essen (31 December 1900 – 23 August 1973) was a Finnish military colonel and a Knight of the Mannerheim Cross.

Von Essen was also an equestrian. He competed in the individual eventing at the 1928 Summer Olympics.

References

External links
 

1900 births
1973 deaths
Finnish male equestrians
Olympic equestrians of Finland
Equestrians at the 1928 Summer Olympics
People from Lappeenranta
Finnish officers
Knights of the Mannerheim Cross
Sportspeople from South Karelia
Finnish nobility